Jérémie is a commune and capital city of the Grand'Anse department in Haiti. It had a population of about 31,000 at the 2003 census. It is relatively isolated from the rest of the country. The Grande-Anse River flows near the city.

Jérémie is called the city of the poets because of the numerous writers, poets, and historians born there.

History 

During 1762, French General Thomas-Alexandre Dumas was born here. He is mostly known for fighting under Napoleon in Italy and Egypt.

In 1964, during the Jérémie Vespers, the Haitian army and the Tonton Macoutes massacred 27 people in Jérémie.

In the early 2000s, archaeologists uncovered an ancient synagogue of Crypto-Jews in the city, the only one found on the island. Jérémie has historically been inhabited by many mixed-race families of Jewish descent.

In the aftermath of the 2010 earthquake, a food aid convoy transporting aid delivered to Jérémie Airport through Jérémie encountered a hijacking attempt by 20 men, on 30 January 2010. Medical supplies have also been airlifted through the airport, due to the increase in medical needs from injured refugees arriving in the wake of the quake.
 
In October 2016, Jérémie was almost completely destroyed by Hurricane Matthew as it went past Haiti.

Facilities
The city has an airport, Jérémie Airport.
The area of the airport of Jérémie is known as "Numero Deux". Mission Aviation Fellowship conducts charter flights into the airport.

Locations in Jérémie
Beaudrouin, Campagne, Carrefour Sanon, Dayere, Duranton, La Forêt, Leopold, Lori, Marche Leon, Previle, Rampe des Lions and Sassierrrve

Notable natives and residents
Thomas-Alexandre Dumas, a general of the French Revolutionary Wars, was born in Jérémie as the son of a French nobleman and his African slave, before independence. Dumas lived most of his life in France, where his father took him at age 18. He married and was the father of Alexandre Dumas, who became a noted and prolific author in the nineteenth century. 
Joseph Serge Miot, was born there. He was the Archbishop of Port-au-Prince, and was killed in the 2010 Haiti earthquake.
Emile Roumer (1903–1988), a poet.
Modeste Testas (1765 - 1870), formerly enslaved Ethiopian woman, whose statues stands in Bordeaux commemorating the transatlantic slave trade.
Etzer Vilaire (1872–1951), a poet
Elisabeth Dieudonné Vincent (1798-1883) free colored businesswoman

References

Communes of Haiti
Gulf of Gonâve
Historic Jewish communities in North America
Jews and Judaism in Haiti
 
Populated places in Grand'Anse (department)
Port cities in the Caribbean
Populated coastal places in Haiti